Åke-Erik Roland Andersson (born 28 March 1950) is a former Swedish football player and coach. His most recent job was that as the assistant coach of the Nigeria national team under Lars Lagerbäck.

As a player, he played for Malmö FF and Djurgårdens IF and was a part of the Swedish squad in the 1978 FIFA World Cup in Argentina.

As a coach, he has coached at Al-Shaab (United Arab Emirates), BSC Young Boys (Switzerland), Al-Ittihad (Saudi Arabia), Qatar SC (Qatar) and Malmö FF. His latest post was assistant coach for the Sweden national football team, appointed in 2004 by Lars Lagerbäck. In 2010, Andersson was appointed Head of Development and Scouting on a consulting basis at his former club Malmö FF. However this did not last for very long; in February 2010, he was appointed assistant coach at Nigeria under former colleague Lars Lagerbäck. Currently Anderson works as an analyst for the Icelandic national football team.

Honours 

 Malmö FF 
 Allsvenskan: 1970, 1971, 1974, 1977
 Svenska Cupen: 1973, 1974, 1978, 1980

References

External links

Profile at the Swedish football association

1950 births
Living people
Swedish footballers
Footballers from Skåne County
Sweden youth international footballers
Sweden international footballers
1978 FIFA World Cup players
Allsvenskan players
Ittihad FC managers
Qatar SC managers
Malmö FF players
Djurgårdens IF Fotboll players
Swedish football managers
Lunds BK managers
BSC Young Boys managers
Malmö FF managers
Al-Shaab CSC managers
Swedish expatriate football managers
Expatriate football managers in Qatar
Expatriate football managers in Saudi Arabia
Expatriate football managers in Switzerland
Association football defenders
Swiss Super League managers